The Free Burma Coalition was created in 1995 as an umbrella organization for the Free Burma movement. Under the leadership of Zarni, then a graduate student at University of Wisconsin–Madison, it galvanized principally American students, attracted much media attention, and helped force over forty multinational corporations to withdraw from Burma, including ARCO, PepsiCo, and Texaco.

The Free Burma Coalition became one of the largest and most effective human rights campaigns in the world, linking groups and individuals across many countries at its height. It used the boycott of Pepsi to highlight corporate complicity in human rights abuses by the military regime in Burma.

On April 26, 1996, USA Today published a cover story about the Free Burma Coalition with a front page picture of Zarni. 

From 1995 to 1997, the Free Burma Coalition took over the leadership of the existing boycott of Pepsi. Free Burma Coalition activists ramped up the pressure on PepsiCo until 1997 when the company completely severed its remaining business ties in Burma. The Free Burma Coalition also campaigned successfully for the withdrawal of over forty corporations from Burma, including many apparel companies and several oil companies, such as ARCO, Unocal, and Texaco. 

In 2003, Zarni started to express publicly his growing disillusionment with Aung San Suu Kyi's leadership and her policy of sanctions and boycotts. He also attacked what he viewed as the "self-serving ways" of many of his former fellow activists in the Free Burma Coalition and the movement in general. Newspapers inside Burma documented that Zarni had met with members of the military junta during this time. Because, even prior to his perceived coziness with the military and USDP (the political party of the military), Zarni had been regarded by the core network of democracy activists inside Burma as largely an opportunistic fraud, who had not even been in Burma during the 1988 protests, it led to strained relationships between Zarni and other activists. It was unclear whether Zarni expressed his supposed disillusionment of Aung San Suu Kyi's policy only after he was largely ostracized by democracy activists inside the country. It is also unclear whether his meetings with the military fed into his change of heart about sanctions and what relationship he continues to have with the military and its main political party. 

Zarni and a group of Western-educated Burmese dissidents explored alternatives to what they termed as "the sanctions and boycott orthodoxy."  In 2003, Zarni switched his position and started to claim that economic sanctions and political pressure by Western countries on Burma was counter-productive and futile as long as China, India, Thailand and other Asian countries continued to do business with and provide political support to the ruling regime.

Following Zarni's change in policy, the staff and virtually all the group's supporters and funders left the Free Burma Coalition and founded the U.S. Campaign for Burma, which maintains the Free Burma Coalition's mission and policies.

More recently, Zarni has recreated himself as an activist, who is the leading voice on social media, in the various transnational campaigns and movements, which claim to advocate for the Rohingya. He has, once again, switched his position, and now advocates for new sanctions to be placed on Burma. 

The Free Burma Coalition is now largely moribund, with Zarni as the organization's sole spokesperson. Moreover, Zarni now advocates to have Aung San Suu Kyi and other democracy activists inside the country be put on trial in international criminal court for crimes against humanity against the Rohingya. The same individuals and groups that he advocated to "free" previously are now, in his opinion, "genocidal", and deserving of being imprisoned.

External links
Free Burma Coalition

Burmese democracy movements